This is a list of African-American newspapers that have been published in the state of Ohio. 

The history of African-American publishing in Ohio is longer than in many Midwestern states, beginning well before the Civil War.  In 1843, the Palladium of Liberty became Ohio's first African-American newspaper.  It was followed by The Aliened American in Cleveland in the 1850s, and by the Cincinnati Colored Citizen in 1863, which was one of the few African-American newspapers published during the Civil War.

Notable African-American newspapers currently published in Ohio include the Akron Reporter, The Cincinnati Herald, the Cleveland Call and Post,  The Toledo Journal, and the Youngstown Buckeye Review.

Newspapers

See also 
List of African-American newspapers and media outlets
List of African-American newspapers in Indiana
List of African-American newspapers in Michigan
List of African-American newspapers in Pennsylvania
List of African-American newspapers in West Virginia
List of newspapers in Ohio

Works cited

References

External links 
Ohio Historical Society list

Newspapers
Ohio
African-American newspapers
African-American